The Scranton Button Company was a U.S. corporation, founded in Scranton, Pennsylvania, in 1885.

For much of its early history it was controlled by Canadian immigrant William Connell (September 10, 1827 – March 21, 1909). Connell's family moved to Scranton when he was a small child, and at the age of 7 he left school to work in the coal industry to help support his family. With time he moved up to supervisory positions and became rich enough to buy the company when its charter expired, and Connell became an influential Scranton businessman, serving on several boards of directors. He purchased the Scranton Button Company shortly after its founding.

Besides buttons, the company manufactured parts for telephones and advertising novelties. By 1915, the company was pressing 3 million buttons per day. Since many of the buttons were made out of shellac, the company had the ability to work with this material and in the 1920s it branched out from making buttons into pressing phonograph records out of the same material. It offered full-service record production to any retailer that desired its own label.

In 1924, it bought Emerson Records and in July 1929 it merged with Regal Records, Cameo Records, Banner Records and the US branch of Pathé Records to form the American Record Corporation.

From 1929-on, Scranton pressed Brunswick, Melotone, Perfect, Banner, Regal, Domino, Conqueror, Vocalion and other ARC labels.  (Even though Columbia was bought by ARC in 1934, Columbia records were pressed at Columbia's Bridgeport, CT. plant.)

The Scranton plant was acquired in 1946 by Capitol Records.  Though some sources have asserted that Capitol closed the factory in 1970, the label continued to operate the plant until July 1973 and then sold it that November to a Pittsburgh firm, North American Music Industries, which kept the plant in business until its final closure around 1980.

References

Manufacturing companies based in Pennsylvania
Manufacturing companies established in 1885
Scranton, Pennsylvania